"On My Own" is a song by Syrian-Swedish singer Bishara. The song was performed for the first time in Melodifestivalen 2019, where it made it to the finale. The song peaked at number four on the Swedish Singles Chart and subsequently placed at number 100 on the Swedish Year-end Singles Chart. It was also certified platinum in Sweden.

Charts

Weekly charts

Year-end charts

Certifications

References

2019 singles
English-language Swedish songs
Melodifestivalen songs of 2019
Swedish pop songs
Songs written by Benjamin Ingrosso
Songs written by Robert Habolin
Songs written by Marcus Sepehrmanesh